Nijaz Gracić (born 6 February 1953) is a Bosnian entrepreneur, football administrator and former 30th president of the assembly of Bosnian Premier League club Sarajevo and also former 6th chairman First League of FBiH club Olimpik.

References

1957 births
Living people
Businesspeople from Sarajevo
Bosniaks of Bosnia and Herzegovina
Bosnia and Herzegovina chairpersons of corporations
FK Sarajevo presidents of the assembly